is a Japanese actor. He is currently a freelancer.

Biography
Mayama graduated from Natori City Midori Junior High School and Miyagi Prefecture Sendai Mukayama High School. In 2004, he won the special prize at the 17th Junon Super Boy Contest. In 2006, Mayama debuted with the drama Regatta: Kimi toita Eien. In 2016, he was cast as Adel, the main villain of the tokusatsu series, Kamen Rider Ghost. On September 1, 2020, he announced his retirement from the entertainment industry. He currently works in real estate.

Filmography

TV dramas

Films

Stage

Advertisements

DVD

References

Japanese male actors
Actors from Miyagi Prefecture
1988 births
Living people